Michael Bella (born 29 September 1945) is a German former professional footballer who played as a defender.

Career 
Bella was born in Duisburg. Between 1964 and 1978, he played for MSV Duisburg in the Bundesliga, playing 405 games, a record for the club. He scored 13 goals in this time. He also stood with Duisburg in the German Cup finals of 1966 and 1975, however both finals were lost. Between 1968 and 1971, Bella played four times in the West Germany national team. He was an unused member of the title-winning DFB squad for Euro 72.

External links

References

1945 births
Living people
Footballers from Duisburg
Association football defenders
German footballers
Germany international footballers
Germany under-21 international footballers
MSV Duisburg players
UEFA European Championship-winning players
UEFA Euro 1972 players
Bundesliga players
West German footballers